Flensburg is a neighbourhood of Malmö, situated in the Borough of Södra Innerstaden, Malmö Municipality, Skåne County, Sweden. As of 2008, it had 669 inhabitants and covers an area of 19 hectares.

References

Neighbourhoods of Malmö